Glyptoteles is a monotypic moth genus belonging to the family Pyralidae. Its single species, described by Philipp Christoph Zeller in 1848, Glyptoteles leucacrinella, is found in most of Europe except Great Britain, Ireland, Fennoscandia, Portugal and most of the Balkan Peninsula.

The caterpillars of G. leucacrinella have been noted for the unusual food they may eat – vegetable remains and dry leaves.

Otherwise, they feed on alder trees (Alnus).

Footnotes

References
  (1942): Eigenartige Geschmacksrichtungen bei Kleinschmetterlingsraupen ["Strange tastes among micromoth caterpillars"]. Zeitschrift des Wiener Entomologen-Vereins 27: 105-109.

External links
Fauna Europaea

Phycitinae
Moths of Europe
Monotypic moth genera
Pyralidae genera